Varengold Bank AG is a German bank founded in Hamburg in 1995 that also has offices in London and Sofia.

Divisions
In the marketplace banking division, the bank supports online marketplaces that deal with the financing of companies and consumers (peer-to-peer platforms). Varengold finances the growth of fintech companies and provides them with products requiring a banking license (fronting services). In the transaction banking and commercial banking division, the bank provides foreign trade-oriented customers with basic products such as account relationships and international payment transactions. The bank also has a customer base for trade finance transactions (e.g., guaranties or letters of credit).

Varengold Bank AG is registered with the Federal Financial Supervisory Authority (BaFin) under No. 109520 and is affiliated with the Entschädigungseinrichtung deutscher Banken (EdB). Varengold shares (stock symbol VG8) is listed on the Xetra of the Frankfurt Stock Exchange.

History
Varengold was founded in 1995 by Yasin Sebastian Qureshi and Timur Coban as an asset management boutique. Since the company was founded, the focus of its business activities has initially been on derivatives brokerage and services in the area of alternative investments.

In 1998, Varengold was granted a credit institution license by the then Federal Banking Supervisory Office (Bundesaufsichtsamt für das Kreditwesen). In June 2013 Varengold was granted a license as a deposit-taking bank.

Since 20 March 2007, the Varengold shares have been listed in the unofficial market of the Frankfurt Stock Exchange in the Entry Standard market segment. With the discontinuation of the Entry Standard on 1 March 2017, Varengold moved to the Basic Board.

Criticism
The Jerusalem Post reported in October 2018 that Varengold was said to have been doing business with Iran Air at that time despite US sanctions.

The Varengold investment subsidiary was involved in cum-ex transactions. As of 2018, possible claims in the high double-digit millions still burden the bank's balance sheets. The public prosecutor's office in Cologne is investigating the former responsible persons from Varengold due to a particularly serious case of tax evasion.

References

External links 

1995 establishments in Germany
Banks established in 1995
Banks of Germany
Brokerage firms
Companies based in Hamburg
Companies listed on the Frankfurt Stock Exchange